Moan and Groan, Inc. is a 1929 Our Gang short comedy film directed by Robert F. McGowan. Produced by Hal Roach and released to theaters by Metro-Goldwyn-Mayer, it was the 94th Our Gang short to be released.

Synopsis
Friendly neighborhood policeman Kennedy the Cop (Edgar Kennedy) warns the gang to stay away from an old abandoned house in the neighborhood. Instead, he suggests the kids go dig for buried treasure, which they proceed to do—in the basement of the old abandoned house. The house is inhabited by a homeless lunatic (played by Jewish comedian Max Davidson in a rare, mostly non-ethnic role), who takes giddy delight in scaring the children, particularly Farina. Kennedy eventually turns up at the house to save the kids and apprehend the lunatic, but can hardly take care of himself.

Notes
Moan and Groan, Inc. features a short appearance by former Our Gang kid Jay R. Smith, his only appearance in a sound Our Gang short and his final appearance in the series.
Because of its reliance upon Irish American, Jewish American and African American stereotypes, Moan and Groan, Inc. was deleted from King World's Little Rascals television package in 1971.

Cast

The Gang
 Norman Chaney as Chubby
 Jackie Cooper as Jackie
 Allen Hoskins as Farina
 Bobby Hutchins as Wheezer
 Mary Ann Jackson as Mary Ann
 Bobby Mallon as Bobby
 Pete the Pup as Himself

Additional cast
 Betty Jane Beard as Trellis, Farina's baby brother
 Jay R. Smith as Kid with Japanese handcuffs
 Max Davidson as The Lunatic
 Edgar Kennedy as Kennedy the Cop

See also
 Our Gang filmography

References

External links

1929 films
American black-and-white films
1929 comedy films
Films directed by Robert F. McGowan
Hal Roach Studios short films
Our Gang films
1929 short films
1920s American films